James Steen was the head coach of the swim teams at Kenyon College from 1976 to 2012.

Steen's teams have won more NCAA championships than any other team in any division or any sport. Under his leadership the Lords won 31 consecutive NCAA Division III championships, the first having been in 1980, while the Ladies have won 17 consecutive (23 nonconsecutive) titles beginning 1984. In over 30 years at Kenyon, Coach Steen has developed over 150 NCAA champions and over 300 All-Americans. He has coached several Olympic Trial qualifiers, Division I All-Americans, and been voted CSCAA Division III Coach-of-the-year twelve times.  He has also produced more post-graduate scholars than any other coach in any division, and places high importance on students' academic performance as well as athletic success.

In 1996 Coach Steen took a one-year sabbatical from Kenyon College to consult with many of America's top coaches prior to the Atlanta Olympic Games.  He was also consulted during the designing and building of the swimming facilities for the Kenyon Athletic Center in 2002.  In August 2008, he was invited to give an informational "pep talk" to the Ohio State Buckeyes football team.
Steen was an early adopter of sports psychology and used visualization and cross training practices long before other programs.

Steen is the creator of the Power Rack, and began the Elite Swim Camps, which have grown to sports other than swimming.

Steen retired from coaching in 2012 after 36 years. He was replaced by Kenyon former Kenyon swimmer Jess Book, who has won three consecutive NCAA Division III titles. 

Former Kenyon swimmers now coaching at the college level include NCAA Champion Coaches Gregg Parini (Denison)  and Jon Howell (Emory).

References

External links
 Kenyon profile

Year of birth missing (living people)
Living people
American swimming coaches
College swimming coaches in the United States
Kenyon Lords and Ladies swimming and diving